The Export Administration Act (EAA) of 1979 (P.L. 96-72) provided legal authority to the President to control U.S. exports for reasons of national security, foreign policy, and/or short supply. The act was in force from 1979 to 1994, with a lapse in 1984–85. During this lapse, and upon the law's expiration, the authority of export regulations was continued by executive authority. Presidents Ronald Reagan, Bill Clinton, and George W. Bush each declared that the expiration created an emergency under the International Emergency Economic Powers Act and reauthorized all regulations on that basis.

The Act was repealed by the Export Controls Act of 2018 enacted on August 4, 2018. That law made the Export Administration Regulations permanent. However, "because the implementation of certain sanctions authorities, including sections 11A, 11B, and 11C of the Export Administration Act,"  (that were not repealed), the president must continue to use the IEEPA to reauthorize every year.

Regulation forbidding Anti-Israel boycotts 

The U.S. Department of Commerce's Bureau of Industry and Security is charged with enforcing and administering the anti-boycott laws under the Export Administration Act.

"Those laws discourage, and in some circumstances, prohibit U.S. companies from furthering or supporting the boycott of Israel sponsored by the Arab League, and certain Muslim countries, including complying with certain requests for information designed to verify compliance with the boycott."

See also 
Export Administration Regulations (EAR)
International Traffic in Arms Regulations (ITAR)
Boycott, Divestment and Sanctions

References 

 

United States federal trade legislation
1979 in law
96th United States Congress
Economic warfare
United States federal defense and national security legislation